Mohamed Fawzi (born Mohamed Fawzi Habbas Elhaw, August 15, 1918 – October 20, 1966) was an Egyptian singer-songwriter, actor, and filmmaker. He was a leading entertainer and impresario in the thriving musical film scene of Egypt in the 1940s and 1950s. He founded the El-Sharq El-Awsat record plant on April 30, 1959, and turned it into Sono Cairo /Sout El Qahira (The voice of Cairo) Records on January 6, 1964. Fawzi composed the music for "Kassaman", the Algerian national anthem, with lyrics by "poet of the Algerian Revolution" Moufdi Zakaria.

Early life and studies
He was born in the village of Kafr Abou Gendi, a neighborhood of Qutour in the Gharbia Governorate. He was the twenty-first child out of twenty-five sons and daughters, the latter including singers Huda Sultan and Hend Allam. He was an Oud player at a very young age. His sister was the renowned actress and singer Huda Sultan. Fawzi attended elementary school in Tanta, Egypt, where he was a quick study on music with his father's friend, firefighter Mahmoud El Kharbaty, serving as initial tutor. El Kharbaty brought Fawzi along to sing at birthdays, nights, and weddings, where he was influenced by the songs of Mohamed Abdel Wahab and Umm Kulthum.

After graduating from preparatory school, he joined the King Fuad I Institute of Music in Cairo, but he gave up his studies two years later to work in the nightclub of sisters Ratiba and Ensaf Rushdie. Hired away by Badia Masabni's disco, he met luminaries there such as Farid El Atrash, Mohamed Abd El Mottleb, and Mahmoud El Sherief, with whom he collaborated on composing and singing for sketches and revues. He took the radio exam in 1938 at the age of 20, failing a year after El Atrash had succeeded. Mahmoud El Sherief's success going the composing route first led Fawzi to choose that approach.

Career
Arriving in Cairo in 1938, he at first made ends meet working in theatre companies and nightclubs, including those of Badia Masabni and Fatima Rushdi, and then the "Egyptian National Theatre" where his path to fame started to kick.

Fascinated by music, he was an aficionado in particular of pioneering singer-songwriter Sayed Darwish. An initial foray as understudy for Ibrahim Hamouda, in a production by the Egyptian Troupe for Acting and Music Darwish's operetta Shahrazad (Scheherezade) with direction by Zaki Talimatt and an orchestra led by Mohammed Hassan El shougai, was a failure. However, Rushdi gave him a second chance to work in her group as actor, composer, and singer. In 1944, Youssef Wahbi cast Fawzi in a small part in the film Seif El gallad, in which he sang two songs of Darwish on the condition of dropping the Habs Abdel-Al Haw from his name. The role brought Fawzi to the attention of director Mohammed Karim, who cast him as the lead in the 1946 film Ashab El Saada (Happiness Owners) alongside Suleiman Naguib and singer Ragaa Abdou. This time Fawzi was the one given a condition, namely plastic surgery for his slightly flat philtrum. The success of the film gave Fawzi the funds to start his eponymous production company in 1947.

Egyptian Radio, which had turned Fawzi down as a staff singer, broadcast his film songs nevertheless. After the Egyptian revolution of 1952, he was put into heavy rotation with songs such as the patriotic "بلدي أحببتك يا بلدي" ("My Country, I Love You, My Country") and the religious "يا تواب يا غفور" ("At Tawwaab (Oh Contrite), Oh Forgiving") and "إلهي ما أعدلك" ("My God, What Do You Do?"). His children's songs from the movie Moegezet Al Samaa, including "ماما زمانها جاية" ("Mama, Her Time Is Here") and "ذهب الليل" ("Zahab El Lailou", "The Night Is Gone"), were also popular then. He participated in the government's 1953 charitable donation drives throughout Lower Egypt and Upper Egypt known as the "Mercy Trains", along with other celebrities (e.g., Madiha Yousri, Emad Hamdy, Shadia, Farid Shawqi, and Huda Sultan), to say nothing of impromptu concerts in hospitals and social care centers.

Fawzi wrote many songs for himself to sing in his films. He also composed for other singers of his time, including Mohamed Abd El Mottaleb, Leila Mourad, Nazik, Huda Sultan, and Nagah Salam.

National anthem
In 1956, two Algerian officials went to Egypt and met him at the headquarters of the Voice of the Arabs radio station, a Pan-Arabist radio station founded under the rule of Egypt's former president Gamal Abd El Nasser, to commission the Algerian anthem. When the head of the music office department, Mohamed Aboul Fotouh, remarked that a "light music" composer was unsuited to writing a national anthem, Fawzi rose to the challenge and wrote the one still in use.

Business interests
In 1958, Fawzi founded his own label, Sono Cairo. Their price of 35 piasters an album beat the foreign majors' 90-piaster fare. Hence, he was able to command sessions with greats of the era, including Umm Kulthum and Mohamed Abdel Wahab. The successful business was nationalized by the government in 1961, and though he was given a salary of £E100 to run it, he hardly got the chance and was marginalized within it. He fell into a depression and died of leukemia on October 20, 1966. Ahmed El-Samahi writes:

The nationalization destroyed him. After he put his all into the company, his role in it began to shrink, until the promise of a monthly salary of one hundred pounds and a head office of his own yielded to the reality that his office was in a tea and coffee buffet.

Filmography 
At 36 films (in addition to a cameo in Layali Al-Qahira in 1939), . He sang other composers' material in some of his films, including in Qabelni Ya Abi, Nargis, Thawrat El-Madinah, and Leila, Bint El-Shatie, while Mohamed Abdel Wahab and Farid al-Atrash wrote all their own music.

Actor

Producer
Fawzi produced a number of films between 1947 and 1959, all of which starred him except for Fatawat el Husseinia and The Absent Lady.
Year Film(s)

Family

Fawzi is the brother of actress and singer Huda Sultan and singer Hend Allam.

In 1943, Fawzi married his first wife, Mrs. Hedaya, with whom he had three children: engineer Nabil (born in 1944), engineer Samir (born in 1946), and doctor Mounir (born in 1948). They divorced in 1952, after which he married actress Madiha Yousri and had a son named Amr in 1955 and one other son with her. In 1959, he divorced again and married his third wife, Karima, with whom he had his youngest daughter Iman in 1961. They remained together until his death.

Death and legacy

He had established the first record label in the Middle East, including an in-house recording studio. The nationalization of the label was perhaps the greatest shock of his life, and his health deteriorated from there on as international doctors struggled to diagnose him. Nowadays known as idiopathic retroperitoneal fibrosis, the German doctor labeled it Fawzi's disease. It claimed his life on October 20, 1966.

He wrote around 400 songs, about 300 of which were featured in films. Among the highlights are "Habibi Wa Aynaneh", "Shahat El Gharam", "Tamali Fi Qalbi", "Wahshuna Al Habayeb", "I Love the One Who Loves You", and "Mal Elkamar". His children's songs have endured, including "Mama Zamanha Gaya" and "Zahab Al-Layl." Thematic and seasonal novelties include the patriotic song "Balady Habibty", the Ramadan favorite "Bring the Lanterns, Boys", and "It's You, Mother", a popular Mother's Day dedication. Ya Mustafa became a pan-European hit when it was covered by French-Egyptian singer Bob Azzam.

References

External links
 
 MP3 version of Kassaman
 The musical score, the text in arabic and french, on the Presidency's Website
 
 
 El Cinema page
 MusicBrainz page
 Discogs page
 Sama3y page
 National Library of France page

1918 births
1966 deaths
Egyptian composers
20th-century Egyptian male singers
Musicians from Cairo
Egyptian male film actors
People from Tanta
20th-century Egyptian male actors
Egyptian oud players